Nandagire Christine Ndiwalana is a Ugandan politician. She was elected to Parliament in the 2021 general election, as a National Unity Platform MP representing Bukomansimbi North in Bukomansimbi District .

Life
Nandagire Christine Ndiwalana holds a bachelor's degree in medicine and surgery from Makerere University. Previously known as Christine Nandagire, she changed her name to Nandagire Christine Ndiwalana by deed poll in 2018.

In August 2019 she was announced as the Democratic Party candidate to contest Bukomansimbi North in Bukomansimbi District. She subsequently moved to the National Unity Platform. After internal disputes split the National Resistance Movement in the area, She defeated the incumbent MP Ruth Katushabe to be elected to Parliament for 2021-26.

References

Year of birth missing (living people)
Living people
Members of the Parliament of Uganda
Women members of the Parliament of Uganda
21st-century Ugandan politicians
21st-century Ugandan women politicians